Look at Yourself is the third studio album by English rock band Uriah Heep, released in September 1971 by Bronze Records in the UK and Mercury Records in the US. It was the last Uriah Heep album to feature founding member and bassist Paul Newton.

Characterized as heavy metal and progressive rock, the album came to be viewed as a high point in the band's career and is regarded by many fans and critics as one of Uriah Heep's finest albums, along with Demons and Wizards, released the following year. The title track and "July Morning" were released as singles in the UK and North America in 1971 and 1973, respectively. 
 
The song "July Morning" was the inspiration for a Bulgarian tradition, known eponymously as July Morning or "Julaya", of gathering on the beach on the Black Sea coast on the morning of 1 July to watch the sunrise.

The album was mentioned in the David Sedaris book Barrel Fever, in "Don's Story".

Look at Yourself was remastered and reissued by Castle Communications in 1996 with three bonus tracks, and again in 2003 in an expanded deluxe edition. In 2017, Sanctuary Records released a two-disc deluxe edition.

Cover art
The original cover art on the LP featured a single sleeve with a die-cut opening on the front through which a reflective foil "mirror" was seen, conveying a distorted image of the person viewing it. The idea, by guitarist Mick Box, was for the cover to directly reflect the album title, and this theme is carried through the band photos on the rear of the LP sleeve, which have also been distorted. The LP itself was housed in a heavy-duty inner card, complete with lyrics.

Reception

In a favorable contemporary review, Billboard, noting that the band was "determined to break through", described the music in the album as "a mirror, as the hard rock five produce a driving, psychedelic flow that's sufficiently hypnotic, controlled and groovy to reflect the tastes of many youthful rockers."

Retrospective reviews have also been positive. AllMusic's Donald A. Guarisco deemed Look at Yourself to be the point where "the group perfects its fusion of heavy metal power and prog rock majesty". The album was praised for its track selection, which ranged from "powerful" rockers to the prog-oriented "July Morning", and for singer David Byron's "multi-octave, operatic style."

Look at Yourself was ranked at No. 97 in the 100 Heavy Metal albums of All Time list published by the magazine Kerrang!.

Covers
Gamma Ray covered "Look at Yourself" on their Heading for Tomorrow album (1990).
GrimSkunk covered "Look at Yourself" on their Grim Skunk album (1994).

Track listings

Personnel
Uriah Heep
David Byron – lead vocals (all but "Look at Yourself")
Mick Box – lead guitar, acoustic guitar
Paul Newton – bass guitar
Ken Hensley – organ, piano, slide guitar, acoustic guitar, backing vocals, lead vocals on "Look at Yourself"
Ian Clarke – drums

Additional musicians
Manfred Mann – Moog synthesizer on "July Morning" and "Tears in My Eyes"
Ted Osei, Mac Tontoh and Loughty Amao (from Osibisa) – percussion on "Look at Yourself"

Production
Gerry Bron – producer
Peter Gallen – engineer, mixing

Charts

Album

Weekly charts

Year-end charts

Singles

Certifications

References

Uriah Heep (band) albums
1971 albums
Bronze Records albums
Mercury Records albums
Albums produced by Gerry Bron